RREUSE (Reuse and Recycling European Union Social Enterprises) is an international non-profit network (NGO), linking social enterprises active in the field of reuse, repair and recycling sector. It puts the three pillars of sustainability: environmental protection, social equity, and economic viability, at equal level.

Mission and Activity 
RREUSE's mission is to empower, represent and support and social and circular enterprise community and to lobby at European level for stronger policies in favour of repair and reuse of end-of-life products. RREUSE wishes to see an inclusive circular economy based on re-use and repair for the good of both society and the environment. Based in Belgium, RREUSE notes that they have 102,000 employees, trainees and volunteers working across more than 29 countries. 

RREUSE activities include:
•	Representing, promoting and communicating information about social enterprises
•	Advocating for a stronger policy framework at EU level
•	Forming alliances with other EU associations
•	Facilitating exchanges of best practice and contacts
•	Gathering data on the re-use and repair sector
•	Acting as partner in international projects 

RREUSE also carries out international projects in cooperation with other institutions like universities and research centres, for example the LOWaste Project or the Quali Pro Second Hand Project II (a European project on the innovation transfer of a qualification profile "second hand").

In 2011, RREUSE received the European Week for Waste Reduction award for the campaign.

Origin 
Interests in social enterprises working together in environmental services increased during 1999-2001. A few events and projects were set by a few organisations from the social economy sector. Some organisations also started working together on the forthcoming European WEEE Directive (adopted in 2001), to address the concern about the possible impact of the WEEE-Directive on social enterprises working in the recycling and reuse sector. In November 2000, a decision was made to develop a European network of social enterprises working in the waste sector to provide a forum for political debates and unfolding legislation in Brussels on a more regular basis. 

A network of 17 social enterprises was constituted on 26 February 2001. Representatives from the European Parliament, Belgium Ministry for Social Economy, and the Directorate Environment of the European Commission  expressed their general support. RREUSE was founded in August 2022 under Belgium law with the status of a Non-profit organisation. 

In 2003, RREUSE opened a secretariat for Belgium and international environmental and social NGO's at Mundo-B house, an ecologically renovated office building in the centre of Brussels.

RREUSE members are: 

	AERESS (Spain)
       Association Citizens "Hands" (Bosnia & Herzegovina)
       Associazione Orius (Italy)
	BKN (Netherlands)
	Cooperativa Sociale Insieme (Ireland) 
	CRNI(Ireland)
	CRNS (UK) 
	Dobrote z.b.o (Slovenia)
	donateNYC (United States) 
       Ecological Recycling Society (Greece)
       EKON (Poland)  
       Emmaüs Europe
	Emmaüs France (France) 
	ENVIE (France)
       Herwin (Belgium)
	Humana Nova (Croatia) 
	Humusz Szövetség (Hungary)
       Kierrätyskeskus Oy (Finland)   
	Klimax Plus (Greece)
	Macken (Sweden)  
	RECOSI (Ireland)
	RehabRecycle (Ireland)
       RepaNet (Austria) 
	RESSOURCES (Belgium)
       Reuseful UK (UK) 
       Tramel Oy (Finland)
       Uuskasutuskeskus (Estonia) 

The network RREUSE has a non-bureaucratic structure. 
The members meet three times a year working on the different waste streams, such as:

 WEEE (Waste electrical and electronic equipment), 
 Textiles, 
 Bulky waste, 
 Bio-waste, 
 Resource consumption and product policies etc. 

Most of the work is done by volunteer members between the meetings.

Funding 
RREUSE is financed by the membership fees. In the first two years RREUSE received seed funding from the Belgian Government to promote the launch of the organisation. Later, RREUSE received some funding by DG Environment and DG Education. Recently RREUSE has received funding from Fondation de France.

See also 
Waste Electrical and Electronic Equipment Directive
Computer recycling
Electronic waste
Planned obsolescence
European Ecodesign Directive
Life-cycle assessment
Waste hierarchy
European Waste Hierarchy
Restriction of Hazardous Substances Directive
European Employment Strategy
Social economy
Social inclusion
Biodegradable waste

References

External links 
 

Recycling organizations
International organizations based in Europe